Christina Hart (born July 21, 1949) is an American film producer, film director, playwright and retired actress. She teaches acting at the Hollywood Court Theater.

She has appeared in such films as The Stewardesses (1969), The Mad Bomber (1973) and Charley Varrick (1973).

Life and career
Christina Hart was born on July 21, 1949 in Lock Haven, Pennsylvania, to an elementary school teacher father. She has been acting professionally since 1958 in television and motion pictures, although she has stated that her true passion is for the theater. She formed DOXA Productions with actress Kara Pulcino, and has produced and directed under that label since 2006.

She was married to actor Frank Doubleday for over 40 years, until his death in 2018. The couple have two daughters, actresses Kaitlin and Portia Doubleday.

Theater
As a playwright, Hart is most known for Women Over the Influence and Birds of a Feather, and was nominated for an LA Stage Alliance Ovation Award for Best Original Play in 2012.  She has directed over 50 plays.

Filmography
 The Stewardesses (1969) as Samantha
 The Woman and Bloody Terror (1970) as Karen Washington
 Red Sky at Morning (1971) as Velva Mae Cloyd
 The Roommates (1973) as Paula
 The Mad Bomber (1973) as Fromley's Victim
 Charley Varrick (1973) as Jana
 The Bunny Caper (aka Sex Play, Games Girls Play) (1974) as Bunny O'Hara
 The Daughters of Joshua Cabe Return (1975) as Charity
 The Runaway Barge (1975) as Reba Washburn
 Keep Off My Grass! (1975)
 Johnny Firecloud (1975) as June
 Addie and the King of Hearts (1976) as Kathleen Tate
 Dead of Night (1977) as Helen
 Mean Dog Blues (1978) as Gloria Kinsman
 The Night the City Screamed (1980) as Woman in Elevator
 The Sophisticated Gents (1981) as Gerda
 Hear No Evil (1982) as Sheila Green
 The Check Is in the Mail... (1986) as Janet

Television
 Ironside (1972) as Jan Ritter
 The Bold Ones: The New Doctors (1972) as Jan Ritter
 Can Ellen Be Saved? (1974) as Mary
 Shazam! (1974) as Holly
 The Rookies (1974) as Lorna Marsh
 Petrocelli (1974) as Niki James
 The Odd Couple (1975) as Susan
 The Texas Wheelers (1975) as Librarian
 The Blue Knight (1976) as Kiki
 Helter Skelter (1976) as Patricia "Katie" Krenwinkel
 Happy Days (1974–1976) as Carole Actman/Kitty
 Charlie's Angels (1976) as Billie
 C.P.O. Sharkey (1977) as Helen
 The Six Million Dollar Man (1977) as Margaret
 The Fantastic Journey (1977) as Gwenith
 The Streets of San Francisco (1977) as Nancy Telson
 Three's Company (1977) as Karen
 Hawaii Five-O (1977) as Chris Harmon
 Barnaby Jones (1976–1978) as Amanda/Jenna Smith
 David Cassidy: Man Undercover (1978) as Bobbi
 The Incredible Hulk (1979) as Cassie Floyd
 The Runaways (1979) as Jeanne Norris
 Detective School (1979) as Yolanda
 B. J. and the Bear (1980, Season 2, Episode 26, "Bear Bondage") as Janet Lockwood
 The Love Boat (1981) as Cindy Sterling
 Three's Company (1977–1981) as Francesca Angelino/Karen
 Dynasty (1981) as Bedelia
 CHiPs (1982, Season 5, Episode 17, "Alarmed") as Toni Sykes
 Hear No Evil (1982 made-for-TV-movie) as Sheila Green
 Simon & Simon (1982) as Stewardess April
 Airwolf (1985) as Mrs. Cove
 Murder, She Wrote (1989) as Sister Maria

References

Citations

Sources

External links
 

1949 births
Living people
Film producers from Pennsylvania
American film actresses
Actresses from Pennsylvania
People from Lock Haven, Pennsylvania
20th-century American actresses
American women film directors
American women dramatists and playwrights
21st-century American women writers
21st-century American dramatists and playwrights
Film directors from Pennsylvania
American women film producers